Saab Aeronáutica Montagens SA is a Brazilian aeronautical company which has operated since 2018 as a subsidiary company of the Sweden aerospace conglomerate Saab AB. The Brazilian aerospace engineering company, Akaer Engenharia SA, has a shareholding in this company.

Saab Aeronáutica Montagens is producing empennage, air brakes, the wingbox, the rear fuselage, and the forward fuselage for their mainline product: Saab JAS 39 Gripen. The manufacturer hopes that in the future this assembly line will be used to manufacture these parts for aircraft that may be sold to other countries.

References

External links

Aerospace companies of Brazil
Aircraft manufacturers of Brazil
Companies based in São Paulo (state)
Defence companies of Brazil
Engineering companies of Brazil
Electronics companies of Brazil
Gas turbine manufacturers
Manufacturing companies of Brazil
Vehicle manufacturing companies established in 2018
Manufacturing companies established in 2018
Technology companies established in 2018
Weapons trade